The Scarlet Letter is a 1926 American  silent drama film based on the 1850 novel of the same name by Nathaniel Hawthorne and directed by Swedish filmmaker Victor Sjöström (credited as Victor Seastrom). Prints of the film survive in the MGM/United Artists film archives and the UCLA Film and Television Archive. The film is now considered the best film adaptation of Hawthorne's novel.

Cast
Lillian Gish as Hester Prynne
Lars Hanson as The Reverend Arthur Dimmesdale
Henry B. Walthall as Roger Chillingworth (credited as playing Roger Prynne)
Karl Dane as Master Giles
William H. Tooker as The Governor
Marcelle Corday as Mistress Hibbins
Fred Herzog as The Jailer
Jules Cowles as The Beadle
Mary Hawes as Patience
Joyce Coad as Pearl
James A. Marcus as A Sea Captain
Nora Cecil as Townswoman (uncredited)
Iron Eyes Cody as Young Native American at Dunking (uncredited) 
Dorothy Gray as Child (uncredited)
Margaret Mann as Townswoman (uncredited)
Polly Moran as Jeering Townswoman (uncredited)
Chief Yowlachie as Native American (uncredited)
May Boley as Jeering Townswoman (uncredited)

Production

The film was the second one Gish made under her contract with M-G-M and a departure from the ingénue roles she had performed in service to director D.W. Griffith. (Her first M-G-M picture was directed by King Vidor, an adaption of La bohème with co-star John Gilbert, in which she played the pathetic consumptive Mimi.) She asked production manager Louis B. Mayer specifically to make The Scarlet Letter: his agreement was reluctant, due to M-G-M's concern that censors would object to a frank depiction of Nathaniel Hawthorne's character, Hester Prynne, whose romantic indiscretions unleash a wave of reactionary bigotry. Director Seastrom disabused these expectations with an opening intertitle "establishing Prynne's [Gish's] ordeal as 'a story of bigotry uncurbed.'"

Shooting took under two months. The production cost a total of $417,000 when factoring out $48,000 overhead costs.

Reception
The film made a profit of $296,000.

The film is recognized by American Film Institute in these lists:
2002: AFI's 100 Years...100 Passions – Nominated
2003: AFI's 100 Years...100 Heroes & Villains:
Hester Prynne – Nominated Hero

See also
Lillian Gish filmography

Footnotes

References
Durgnat, Raymond and Simmon, Scott. 1988. King Vidor, American. University of California Press, Berkeley. 
Malcolm, Paul. 2004. The Scarlet Letter, 1926. UCLA Film and Television Archive: 12th Festival of Preservation, July 22-August 21, 2004. Guest festival guide.

External links

1926 drama films
1926 films
American black-and-white films
American silent feature films
Silent American drama films
Films based on The Scarlet Letter
Films directed by Victor Sjöström
Films with screenplays by Frances Marion
Metro-Goldwyn-Mayer films
1920s American films